Cináed mac Mugróin (died 829) was a king of the Uí Failge, a Laigin people of County Offaly, Ireland. He was the son of Mugrón mac Flainn (died 782), a previous king. He ruled from 806 to 826. 

Nothing is recorded of his reign in the annals other than his death date. His descendants were known as Clann Cináeda. His son Riacáin was ancestor of the Uí Riacáin sept (Hy-Regan). His son Niall mac Cináeda (died 849) was a King of the Uí Failge.

Notes

See also
 Kings of Ui Failghe

References

External links
CELT: Corpus of Electronic Texts at University College Cork

9th-century Irish monarchs
People from County Offaly
829 deaths
Year of birth unknown